A Thousand Suns is a studio album by Australian singer songwriter Russell Morris. It was released in November 1991 and is his first album on the ARIA Chart, at number 98.
Four singles were released from the album, including a remix of Morris' 1969 number-one single, "The Real Thing".

Reception 

Bevan Hannan of The Canberra Times described A Thousand Suns, "[he is] writing prodigiously with aim of launching a revival... [it] is in the damage control category – you can slip it into your stereo and play in the background without offending any tastes." Australian musicologist Ian McFarlane observed, "During the early 1990s there was something of a [Morris] revival... [he] issued a new album... [which] boasted a contemporary studio sheen and featured guest musicians."

Track listing

 "A Thousand Suns" (Russell Morris, Chong Lim) – 5:00
 "Tartan Lines" (Morris, Lim) – 4:19
 "Stay with You" (Morris) – 4:20
 "Child Inside" (Lim, Morris) – 5:00
 "New Dawn"(Lim, Morris) – 5:03
 "Jungle at Night" (Tibor Jopiosh, Morris) – 4:29
 "Between the Waves" (Lim, Morris) – 4:14	
 "The Bigger They Come" (Lim, Morris) – 4:59
 "Steal You Away" (David Briggs, Morris, Marshall Parker) – 3:52
 "Over Excited" (Lim, Morris) – 4:27
 "The Real Thing" (1990 Mix) (John B Young) – 6:28	
 "Stay with You" (Morris) (A-Side Single) (bonus track)
 "Turn to Stone" (Morris) (B-Side Single) (bonus track)
 "This Bird Has Flown" (demo version) (bonus track)

Credits

 Russell Morris – guitar, vocals
 Chong Lim – keyboards
 Graham Thompson, Ian Belton, Jim Landers – bass guitar
 Mark Punch, Mark Moffatt, Ben Butler, Rex Goh – guitar
 Ricky Fataar – drums, percussion
 Andrew Thompson – saxophone
 Venetta Fields, Mark Williams, Mark Punch, Shauna Jensen, Kevin Bennett, Taya Francis – backing vocals

Charts

References

Russell Morris albums
1991 albums
Festival Records albums